Alberto Vinale (born 5 June 1978 in San Donà di Piave) is an Italian former road cyclist. He was professional from 2000 to 2003 with the Italian team . He won the 2002 Grand Prix de Denain, which was his only professional victory.

Major results
2002
 1st Grand Prix de Denain
2003
 8th Dwars door Vlaanderen

Grand Tour general classification results timeline

References

External links 

Italian male cyclists
1978 births
Living people
People from San Donà di Piave
Cyclists from the Metropolitan City of Venice